Pseudosuccinea columella , the American ribbed fluke snail, is a species of air-breathing freshwater snail, an aquatic pulmonate gastropod mollusk in the family Lymnaeidae, the pond snails.

This snail is an intermediate host for Fasciola hepatica, the liver fluke, a parasite of livestock, especially sheep.

Distribution

Indigenous
Pseudosuccinea columella is native to North America. and Europe. The indigenous distribution of Pseudosuccinea columella reaches from New Brunswick and south Manitoba throughout the eastern US to Central and South America.

The exact type locality for this species is unknown, but it is somewhere in the Philadelphia area, US.

Introduced
This snail has been introduced to Australia and Europe.

The non-indigenous distribution of Pseudosuccinea columella includes:
 western US (distribution map in the US)
 Puerto Rico
 Venezuela
 Brazil: Rio Grande do Sul
 Argentina
 Australia
 South Africa – since 1942
 other countries in Africa
 Pacific islands

Europe:
 Switzerland (Basel)
 Austria (Villach)
 Hungary
 Greece (Nómos Florina)
 Menorca (a Spanish island)
 France – in the wild
 Portugal, Madeira Island – in the wild
 Czech Republic as a "hothouse alien"
 Latvia as a "hothouse alien"

Description 
The shell quite closely resembles shells in the genus Succinea, which belongs to a different family.

The shell of Pseudosuccinea columella is horny brown, thin, translucent, fragile and very finely striated. The apex is pointed. The shell has 3.5–4 weakly convex whorls with a shallow suture. The last whorl predominates. The aperture is ovate. The upper palatal margin descends steeply. The columellar margin is reflected only at its upper section; the lower columellar margin sharp and straight.

The width of the shell is 8–13 mm. The height of the shell is 15–20 mm.

The animal is dusky with whitish spots. The eyes are small and black and are located at the inner base of the tentacles.

The haploid number of chromosomes is 18 (n=18).

Habitat 
In North America, Pseudosuccinea columella lives in stagnant waters, at the edges of lakes, ponds, muddy and sluggish streams, among lily pads and reeds on sticks and mud.

In Europe it occurs predominantly in greenhouses, but also sometimes in outdoor habitats (Austria, Hungary). It needs warm water and does not survive Central European winter temperatures. It is also found above the water on floating leaves of aquatic plants; in northern Greece it was found in a spring near a road.

Parasites 
Parasites of Pseudosuccinea columella include:
 In North America, Pseudosuccinea columella is major intermediate host of Fasciola hepatica.
 The species also serve as a snail host for Fascioloides magna.
 Also serves as a host for the cercariae of the trematode Telorchis sp.

References 
This article incorporates public domain text from the reference

External links 

Lymnaeidae
Gastropods described in 1817